McLean Glacier is a tributary glacier located north of Mount Hemphill in the southwest part of the Anare Mountains, Antarctica, draining west and entering the lower part of Ebbe Glacier just south of Beaman Glacier. It was named by the Advisory Committee on Antarctic Names for Kenneth S. McLean, a topographic engineer with the United States Geological Survey Topo East–West party that surveyed this area in the 1962–63 season.

References

Glaciers of Pennell Coast